Bus Simulator 16 is a bus simulator game developed by stillalive studios and published by Astragon Entertainment for Microsoft Windows and macOS. It is powered by Unity and was available on 3 March 2016 worldwide. It is the fourth game in the Bus Simulator series. A sequel titled Bus Simulator 18 was released in 2018.

Gameplay

Bus Simulator 16 has licensed the vehicles of MAN. In addition to the buses of the German bus maker, the game features a total of six buses that allow players to drive across five districts. The game also provides a route manager for players to create their own bus lines. A multiplayer mode is available in the game as well.

Development and release
Bus Simulator 16 was announced July 2015. It is the first game in the series developed by Austrian video game developer stillalive Studios. The game was scheduled to release on 20 January 2016 for Microsoft Windows and macOS, but it was postponed to 3 March 2016 due to technical issues. A bus downloadable content featuring three licensed Mercedes-Benz buses, including an 18-meter long Citaro G articulated bus, were available on 25 January 2017.

Reception

Bus Simulator 16 received "mixed or average" reviews, according to review aggregator Metacritic.

Richard Allen of Invision Community rated a seven to the game. He wrote that the handlings of the game were quite similar with the American Truck Simulator of SCS Software, which was published in the same period.

James Graham of Dark Station gave it three stars out of five. He praised the game's interesting ideas, but criticised its tiny in-game map and a lack of in-depth content.

Brash Games only rated the game a poor three points out of ten. The writer commented, "Bus Simulator 16 is a lifeless, soulless lie of a simulator; and I use the term ‘simulator’ in the loosest possible way."

References

External links 

  

2016 video games
Bus simulation video games
Bus Simulator
MacOS games
Multiplayer and single-player video games
Video games developed in Austria
Windows games